Dzhankoi Raion is one of the 25 regions of Crimea, currently subject to a territorial dispute between the Russian Federation and Ukraine. Population: 

It is located in the northern part of the Crimean steppe near the Syvash Bay. The city of Dzhankoi is the raion's administrative centre, but it is excluded from the region and forms a separate municipality. The North-Crimean canal (the main waterway of northern Crimea supplying the republic with water from the Dnieper river) runs through the district.

History 
On 16 August 2022, during the Russian invasion of Ukraine, a large temporary ammunition store of the Russian forces in the villages of Maiske and Azovske was attacked causing secondary explosions and fires that burned into the next day.  Russian government officials plan to offer amounts of "10, 50 and 100 thousand rubles" to local villagers whose houses were damaged, depending on the magnitude of damage to each structure.

References

Raions of Crimea
 
Buildings and structures destroyed during the 2022 Russian invasion of Ukraine